The Royal Dutch Mathematical Society (Koninklijk Wiskundig Genootschap in Dutch, abbreviated as KWG) was founded in 1778. Its goal is to promote the development of mathematics, both from a theoretical and applied point of view. 

The society publishes the quarterly journal Nieuw Archief voor Wiskunde, the magazine Pythagoras, wiskundetijdschrift voor jongeren for high school children, and the scientific journal Indagationes Mathematicae.

Each year the society organizes a winter symposium for high school teachers. Biannually Koninklijk Wiskundig Genootschap organizes the Dutch Mathematical Congress. Once every three years, the society awards the prestigious Brouwer Medal to a distinguished mathematician. This medal is named after L. E. J. Brouwer.

Honorary members

Institutional members
The society has the following institutional members:

 Centrum Wiskunde & Informatica
 Delft University of Technology
 Eindhoven University of Technology
 Leiden University
 Radboud University Nijmegen
 University of Amsterdam:
 Institute for Logic, Language and Computation
 Korteweg-de Vries Institute for Mathematics
 University of Groningen
 Utrecht University
 Vrije Universiteit Amsterdam

References

External link

Mathematical societies
Learned societies of the Netherlands
Organizations established in 1778
Organisations based in the Netherlands with royal patronage